Store Kamøya is a small island in Nordkapp Municipality in Troms og Finnmark county, Norway. It is located off the eastern coast of the large island of Magerøya where the Kamøyfjorden splits into the Duksfjorden and Skipsfjorden.  It lies just to the southeast of the island of Lille Kamøya and to the east of the fishing village of Kamøyvær, helping to shelter the latter's harbour from the open sea.

See also
List of islands of Norway

References

Nordkapp
Islands of Troms og Finnmark